was a Japanese animation studio based in Kokubunji, Tokyo, founded by former Tatsunoko Production animators on May 1, 1995. They have worked on many popular series such as Nadesico, Love Hina, Shaman King, Fafner, To Love Ru, and Space Battleship Yamato remakes 2199 and 2202.

The company logotype is interesting in that it includes the International Phonetic Alphabet transcription: [zíːbek], not of the Japanese pronunciation, but of a presumed "English" pronunciation.

Closure 
On November 20, 2018, Xebec's parent company, IG Port, sold the studio to Sunrise after constant deficits that the subsidiary had in different years.

On March 5, 2019, Sunrise announced that they established a new company, Sunrise Beyond, at Xebec's address, with Xebec's operations being transferred to it.

Xebec ceased to exist as a business entity on May 31, 2019. Its post-production teams, which were not part of the sale to Sunrise, were broken up and consolidated into several IG Port companies, but Production I.G inherited the company's assets. Copyright of Xebec's past works reverted to the IG Port group as a whole.

Works

TV 
 Sorcerer Hunters (1995–1996)
 Martian Successor Nadesico (1996–1997)
 Bakusō Kyōdai Let's & Go!! (1996–1998)
 Super Yo-Yo (1998–1999)
 Steam Detectives (1998–1999)
 Shogun Recuts (1998–2000)
 Burst Ball Barrage!! Super B-Daman (1999)
 Dai-Guard (1999–2000)
 Zoids: Chaotic Century (1999–2000)
 Love Hina (2000)
 Pilot Candidate (2000)
 Tales of Eternia: The Animation (2001)
 Shaman King (2001–2002)
 Ground Defense Force! Mao-chan (2002)
 Rockman.EXE (2002–2006)
 Bottle Fairy (2003)
 D.N.Angel (2003)
 Stellvia (2003)
 Fafner in the Azure (2004)
 D.I.C.E. (2005)
 Elemental Gelade (2005)
 Petopeto-san (2005; XEBEC M2)
 Negima! Magister Negi Magi (2005)
 Saru Get You -On Air- (2006)
 The Third (2006)
 Buso Renkin (2006–2007)
 Shooting Star Rockman (2006–2008)
 Heroic Age (2007)
 Over Drive (2007)
 Hitohira (2007; XEBEC M2)
 Zombie-Loan (2007; XEBEC M2)
 Mnemosyne (2008)
 To Love Ru (2008)
 Kanokon (2008)
 Kyō no Go no Ni (2008)
 Pandora Hearts (2009)
 Ladies versus Butlers! (2010)
 MM! (2010)
 Motto To Love Ru (2010)
 Hanakappa (2010–present; taken over from Group TAC with OLM)
 Rio: Rainbow Gate! (2011)
 Hen Semi (2011)
 Softenni (2011)
 Lagrange: The Flower of Rin-ne (2012)
 Star Blazers: Space Battleship Yamato 2199 (2012–2013; with AIC on episodes 1–10)
 Nyaruko: Crawling with Love (2012)
 Upotte!! (2012)
 To Love Ru Darkness (2012)
 Haiyore! Nyaruko-san W (2013)
 Pokémon Origins (2013; episodes 2–3)
 Future Card Buddyfight (2014–2015; with OLM)
 Maken-ki! Tsū (2014)
 Broken Blade TV (2014; with Production I.G)
 Argevollen (2014)
 Tokyo ESP (2014)
 Fafner in the Azure: -EXODUS- (2015; XEBECzwei)
 Triage X (2015)
 Future Card Buddyfight 100 (2015–2016; with OLM)
 To Love Ru Darkness 2nd (2015)
 Future Card Buddyfight Triple D (2016–2017; with OLM)
 Keijo!!!!!!!!! (2016)
 BanG Dream! (2017; with ISSEN)
 Future Card Buddyfight X (2017–2018; with OLM)
 Clockwork Planet (2017)
 Tomica Hyper Rescue Drive Head Kidō Kyūkyū Keisatsu (2017; with OLM)
 Future Card Buddyfight X: All-Star Fight (2018; with OLM)
 Full Metal Panic! Invisible Victory (2018)
 Future Card Buddyfight Ace (2018–2019; with OLM)
 Yuuna and the Haunted Hot Springs (2018)
 Space Battleship Yamato 2202 (2018–2019)
 Fafner in the Azure: The Beyond (2019; XEBECzwei; Note: Zwei was transferred over to Production I.G before production was complete)

OVA 
 Sorcerer Hunters (1996–1997)
 Blue Seed Beyond (1998, episode 3)
 Gekiganger III (1998)
 Love Hina: Christmas Special (2000)
 Love Hina: Spring Special (2001)
 Love Hina Again (2002)
 Special Curriculum: The Candidate for Goddess (2002)
 Mahō Sensei Negima! Introduction Film (2004–2005)
 Majokko Tsukune-chan (2005–2006)
 Fafner in the Azure: Right of Left (2005)
 Petit Eva: Evangelion@School (2007; episodes 10–24)
 To Love Ru (2009–2010)
 Kanokon: Manatsu no Daishanikusai (2009)
 Kyō no Go no Ni (2009)
 Pandora Hearts Omake (2009–2010)
 Hen Semi (2010–2011)
 Rinne no Lagrange: Kamogawa Days (2012)
 To Love Ru Darkness (2012–2015)
 Maken-ki! (2013)
 Haiyore! Nyaruko-san F (2015)
 Triage X (2015)
 Fantasista Stella (2015)
 To Love Ru Darkness 2nd (2016–2017)
 Black Clover (2017; XEBECzwei)
 Yuuna and the Haunted Hot Springs (2018)
 Tomica Hyper Rescue Drive Head Kidō Kyūkyū Keisatsu (2018; with OLM)

Movies 
 Let's & Go (1997)
 Martian Successor Nadesico: The Motion Picture – Prince of Darkness (1998; with Production I.G)
 Cyber Team in Akihabara: Summer Vacation of 2011 (1999; with Production I.G)
 Rockman EXE Hikari to Yami no Program (2005)
 Major: Yūjō no Winning Shot (2008)
 Fafner in the Azure: Heaven and Earth (2010)
 Broken Blade (2010–2011; with Production I.G)
 Pokémon the Movie: Black—Victini and Reshiram and White—Victini and Zekrom (2011; with Production I.G and OLM)
 Space Battleship Yamato 2199 (2012–2013; with AIC)
 Space Battleship Yamato 2199: A Voyage to Remember (2014)
 Space Battleship Yamato 2199: Odyssey of the Celestial Ark (2014)
 Space Battleship Yamato 2202 (2017–2019)
 Eiga Drive Head: Tomica Hyper Rescue Kidō Kyūkyū Keisatsu (2018; with OLM)

Game animation 
 Martian Successor Nadesico
 Macross VFX
 Mega Man 8
 Mega Man X3
 Mega Man X4
 Mega Man Maverick Hunter X
 Sorcerer Hunters
 killer7
 Shaman King: Spirit of Shamans (PSX)

Divisions 
In 2003 the subsidiary Xebec M2 was established, which focuses in providing animation assistance for their main studio and other companies (including OLM, as in Pokémon: Destiny Deoxys). It has also produced three full series: Petopeto-san, ZOMBIE LOAN and Hitohira. Its last activity was in 2009/2010.

In 2010, it was followed by Xebeczwei, which handled in-between, key, and 2nd key animation for Xebec's main studio and other anime studios. It later produced the full series Fafner in the Azure: Exodus, which ran throughout 2015.

In late 2018, it was announced the coloring department of Xebec would be transferred to Signal.MD following the release of the former from IG Port. In addition, Xebeczwei would be transferred to Production I.G as a subsidiary and subsequently be renamed IGzwei.

Notes

References

External links 

 
 
 
 

 
Japanese animation studios
Defunct mass media companies of Japan
Mass media companies established in 1995
Mass media companies disestablished in 2019
Japanese companies established in 1995
Japanese companies disestablished in 2019
Animation studios in Tokyo
IG Port